Nick Finan (born 3 July 1954) is a former English cricketer. A right-arm medium-fast bowler, he played irregularly for Gloucestershire between 1975 and 1979.

References

External links

1954 births
Living people
English cricketers
Gloucestershire cricketers
Cricketers from Bristol